The Guldbagge for Best Actor in a Supporting Role is a Swedish film award presented annually by the Swedish Film Institute (SFI) as part of the Guldbagge Awards (Swedish: "Guldbaggen") to actors working in the Swedish motion picture industry.

The categories for Best Supporting Actor and Supporting Actress were first introduced in 1995. In 1992, Ernst Günther received a Guldbagge for Creative Efforts, for his supporting role as Gottfrid in House of Angels.

Winners and nominees 
Each Guldbagge Awards ceremony is listed chronologically below along with the winner of the Guldbagge Award for Actor in a Supporting Role and the film associated with the award. In the columns under the winner of each award are the other nominees for best supporting actor.

Multiple nominations

Notes and references

See also 
 Academy Award for Best Supporting Actor
 BAFTA Award for Best Actor in a Supporting Role
 Golden Globe Award for Best Supporting Actor – Motion Picture
 Broadcast Film Critics Association Award for Best Supporting Actor
 Screen Actors Guild Award for Outstanding Performance by a Male Actor in a Supporting Role

External links 
  
  
 

Supporting actor
Film awards for supporting actor
 
Supporting actor